The  Old synagogues of Tiberias are a group of synagogues situated in the old city of Tiberias, Israel, that date form the 18th and 19th centuries.

They include:

Etz Chaim Synagogue or Abulafia Synagogue, established in 1742 by Rabbi Chaim Abulafia on the site of earlier synagogues. Abulafiah immigrated to Tiberias from Istanbul in 1740 at the invitation of Zahir al-Umar. The synagogue he built still stands, although it underwent major reconstruction following the Near East earthquake of 1759, the Galilee earthquake of 1837 and the great flood of 1934.
Karlin-Stolin Synagogue, established by Karlin-Stolin Hasidim who arrived in the Holy Land in the mid-19th century, settling in Tiberias, Hebron and Safed. In 1869 they redeemed the site of a former synagogue in Tiberias which had been built in 1786 by Menachem Mendel of Vitebsk and destroyed in the Galilee earthquake of 1837. Construction of a new synagogue started in 1870 and was assisted by funds from the diaspora.  The synagogue has a notable Torah Ark in Eastern European style.
Chabad-Lubavitch Synagogue.
 The El Senor Sephardic synagogue, now a standing ruin with an intact roof.
 A North African synagogue.

References

18th-century synagogues
Synagogues in Israel
Jews and Judaism in Ottoman Galilee
Buildings and structures in Tiberias
Buildings and structures in Northern District (Israel)